Savinka is a rural locality (a selo) in Pallasovsky District, Volgograd Oblast, Russia. The population was 3,428 as of 2010. There are 33 streets.

Geography 
Savinka is located on the bank of the Torgun River, 18 km east of Pallasovka (the district's administrative centre) by road. Smychka is the nearest rural locality.

References 

Rural localities in Pallasovsky District